Danilo Erricolo, an Italian-American engineer from the University of Illinois at Chicago was named Fellow of the Institute of Electrical and Electronics Engineers (IEEE) in 2016 for contributions to electromagnetic scattering and associated computational algorithms and also the current Editor-in-Chief of IEEE Transactions on Antennas and Propagation.

References 

Fellow Members of the IEEE
Living people
University of Illinois Chicago faculty
21st-century American engineers
Year of birth missing (living people)
American electrical engineers